Deulgaon, commonly known as "Deulgaon Kundpal" and sometimes as"Deulgaon Kund", is a village located in Lonar taluka of Buldhana district, in state of Maharashtra.

Demographics
As per 2011 census:
Deulgaon Kundpal has 474 families residing. The village has population of 2321.
Out of the population of 2321, 1234 are males while 1087 are females. 
Literacy rate of the village is 76.09%.
Average sex ratio of the village is 881 females to 1000 males. Average sex ratio of Maharashtra state is 929.

Geography, and transport

References

Villages in Buldhana district